Philip Bell may refer to:

 Philip Bell (colonial administrator) (1590–1678)
 Philip Alexander Bell (1808–1889), American newspaper editor
 Philip Ingress Bell (1900–1986), British barrister and judge
 Philip W. Bell (1924–2007), American accounting professor